The Kingdom of Aragon was a medieval and early modern kingdom on the Iberian Peninsula, corresponding to the modern-day autonomous community of Aragon, in Spain. It should not be confused with the larger Crown of Aragon, which also included other territories — the Principality of Catalonia (which included the former Catalan Counties), the Kingdom of Valencia, the Kingdom of Majorca, and other possessions that are now part of France, Italy, and Greece — that were also under the rule of the King of Aragon, but were administered separately from the Kingdom of Aragon.

In 1479, upon John II of Aragon's death, the crowns of Aragon and Castile were united to form the nucleus of modern Spain. The Aragonese lands retained autonomous parliamentary and administrative institutions, such as the Corts. The arrangement remained until the Nueva Planta decrees, promulgated between 1707 and 1715 by Philip V of Spain in the aftermath of the War of the Spanish Succession, centralised power in Spain.

History

Independent kingdom 
Aragon was originally a Carolingian feudal county around the city of Jaca, which in the first half of the 9th century became a vassal state of the kingdom of Pamplona (later Navarre), its own dynasty of counts ending without a male heir in 922. The name Aragón is the same as that of the river Aragón, which flows by Jaca. It might derive from the Basque Aragona/Haragona meaning "good upper valley" (haran+goi+ona, where haran = "valley", goi = "upper, high", and ona = good). Alternatively, the name may be derived from the earlier Roman province of Hispania Tarraconensis.

On the death of Sancho III of Navarre in 1035, the Kingdom of Navarre was divided into three parts: (1) Pamplona and its hinterland along with western and coastal Basque districts, (2) Castile, and (3) Sobrarbe, Ribagorza and Aragon. Sancho's son Gonzalo inherited Sobrarbe and Ribargorza. His illegitimate son Ramiro received Aragon. Gonzalo was killed soon after and all the land he owned went to his brother Ramiro, thus becoming the first de facto king of Aragon, although he never used that title.

By defeating his brother, García Sánchez III of Navarre, Ramiro achieved independence for Aragon. His son Sancho Ramírez, who also inherited the kingdom of Navarre, was the first to call himself "King of the Aragonese and Pamplonese". As the Aragonese domains expanded to the south, conquering land from Al Andalus, the capital city moved from Jaca to Huesca (1096), and later to Zaragoza (1118). After Alfonso the Battler died childless in 1135, different rulers were chosen for Navarre and Aragon, and the two kingdoms ceased to have the same ruler. By 1285 the southernmost areas of what is now Aragon had been taken from the Moors.

Dynastic union with the County of Barcelona 

The Kingdom of Aragon gave the name to the Crown of Aragon, created in 1150 with the dynastic union resulting from the marriage of the Princess of Aragon, Petronilla, and the Count of Barcelona, Ramon Berenguer IV. Their son Alfonso II inherited all of the territories ruled by his father and mother. The King of Aragon also held the title of Count of Barcelona and ruled territories that consisted of not only the present administrative region of Aragon, but also Catalonia, and later the kingdoms of Majorca, Valencia, Sicily, Naples and Sardinia. 

The King of Aragón was the direct ruler of the Aragonese region, and held the titles of Count of Provence, Count of Barcelona, Lord of Montpellier, and Duke of Athens and Neopatria. Each of these titles gave him sovereignty over a certain region, and these titles changed as he won and lost territories. In the 14th century, his power was greatly restricted by the Union of Aragon.

Union of the Crowns of Aragon and Castile and afterwards 
The Crown of Aragon became a part of the Spanish monarchy after the dynastic union with Castile, which supposed the de facto unification of both kingdoms under a common monarch. The house of Barcelona held the Crown until 1410, when it went extinct. Subsequently, in 1412 the Aragonese secured the election of a Castilian prince, Ferdinand of Antequera, to the vacant Aragonese throne, over strong Catalan opposition. One of Ferdinand's successors, John II of Aragon (1458–1479), countered residual Catalan resistance by arranging for his heir, Ferdinand, to marry Isabella, the heir apparent of Henry IV of Castile.

In 1479, upon John II's death, the crowns of Aragon and Castile were united to form the nucleus of modern Spain. Aragonese territories retained their autonomous parliamentary and administrative institutions, such as the Corts, until the Nueva Planta decrees, which were promulgated between 1707 and 1715 by Philip V of Spain in the aftermath of the War of the Spanish Succession. The decrees de jure ended the kingdoms of Aragon, Valencia and Mallorca, and the Principality of Catalonia, and merged them with Castile to officially form the Spanish kingdom. A new Nueva Planta decree in 1711 restored some rights in Aragon, such as the Aragonese Civil Rights, but upheld the end of the political independence of the kingdom.

The previous Kingdom of Aragon remained as an administrative unit until 1833, when it was divided into the three existing provinces. In the aftermath of Francisco Franco's death, Aragon became one of the autonomous communities of Spain in 1982.

Image gallery

See also 
List of Aragonese monarchs
List of Aragonese royal consorts
List of Navarrese monarchs
Counts of Barcelona

References 

Kingdom of Aragon
Aragon
Medieval Spain
Spanish Renaissance
Early Modern history of Spain
Aragon
Aragon
Aragon
States and territories established in 1035
States and territories disestablished in 1707
1035 establishments in Europe
1707 disestablishments in Spain